Cherubini is an Italian surname. Cherubini may refer to:

People 
 Bruno Cherubini (1897-1947), Italian lyricist, brother of Bixio 
 Bixio Cherubini (1899–1987), Italian lyricist, playwright and poet
 Caterina Cherubini (died 1811), Italian miniature painter
 Corkin Cherubini (born 1944), American educator, musician, and writer
 Francesco Cherubini (1585–1656),  Catholic cardinal who served as Bishop of Senigallia
 Gianluca Cherubini (born 1974), Italian professional football player
 Laerzio Cherubini (1556–1626), Italian criminal lawyer and jurisconsult in Rome
 Lorenzo Cherubini (born 1966), birthname of the Italian singer Jovanotti
 Luigi Cherubini (1760–1842), Italian Classical and pre-Romantic composer, close friend of Beethoven
 Mattia Cherubini (born 1988), former Italian footballer 
 Nicole Cherubini (born 1970), American visual artist and sculptor
 Sallustio Cherubini (died 1659),  Roman Catholic prelate who served as Bishop of Città Ducale

Other uses 
 Cherubini Quartet,  German string quartet from Düsseldorf, founded in 1978
 Conservatorio Luigi Cherubini, Italian academic music school located in florence
 Cherubini Group, bridge building firm, see Villiers Island

See also 
 Cherub (disambiguation)
 List of operas by Luigi Cherubini

Italian-language surnames